Denikaina Ready is a 2012 Indian Telugu-language action comedy film directed by G. Nageswara Reddy and produced by Mohan Babu. The film features Vishnu Manchu and Hansika Motwani in the lead roles. The film is a remake of the Malayalam film Udayapuram Sulthan.

Plot

Veera Narasimha Naidu (Prabhu) is a faction leader in Kurnool, who raises his sister Saraswati (Seetha) with love and affection to make her forget the loss of their mother. Around the time of marriage, she elopes with Basha (Suman), whom she loves, which leads to the death of their father. Thus enraged, Narasimha Naidu cuts Basha's leg, which creates a rift between the two families. In a case to win the property belonging to Saraswati, Basha wins the case against Narasimha Naidu after a long 25 years. Seeing the sorrow of Saraswati, her son Sulaiman (Vishnu Manchu) vows to unite the two families and waits for a situation.

Meanwhile, on a suggestion by Sampangi Sastry (M. S. Narayana), Narasimha Naidu appoints his man Bangarraju (Brahmanandam) to find a great scholar to perform a Mahachandi Yagam. He contacts Agnihotra Narasimha Sastry (Amanchi Venkata Subrahmanyam) but as he is unavailable, he goes to the college where Krishna Sastry (Samrat Reddy), the son of Narasimha Sastry studies. Krishna Sastry, in a fit of rage (as his love interest Aparna is close to Sulaiman), shows Sulaiman to Bangarraju and tells him that he is Krishna Sastry, but prefers to be called Sulaiman. Though reluctant initially to accept, Sulaiman accepts that he is Krishna Sastry as this would be a golden chance to unite the two families. He, along with his friend David (Vennela Kishore) and a group of Brahmins (Played by Dharmavarapu Subramanyam, Master Bharath, Raghava, Kadambari Kiran, Ananth and others) goes to the palace of Narasimha Naidu.

There he manages to act well, only to be noticed by Sharmila (Hansika Motwani), daughter of Narasimha Naidu. Though she tries to screen his true colors, he escapes by his wit and timing. In an unexpected turn of events, Bangarraju visits Krishna Sastry's home to pay Sambhavana, but shockingly finds out the truth that Sulaiman is acting as Krishna Sastry. Fearing for his life, he discloses the facts and wants the Yagam to be completed as soon as possible. Sulaiman, though interested in Sharmila, considers his mother's wish very important and starts plotting various plans to intimate feelings on Saraswati in Narasimha Naidu's heart, but all goes in vain. Meanwhile, Narasimha Naidu's opponent Rudrama Naidu (Kota Srinivasa Rao) attacks Sharmila and Sulaiman saves her. Sharmila falls for him and Narasimha feels that the attack was done by Basha.

Things get worse for Sulaiman as Aparna, (Bangarraju's daughter and Krisha's lover) returns to the palace, proposes to him and warns him that if he refuses to reciprocate the feelings, she would reveal the secret. Meanwhile, Sampangi Sastry, who is in deep frustration as Bangarraju did not allow him perform the Yagam, wants to take revenge. Sulaiman plays a very clever game to hide his skin playing with the weaknesses of everyone. Everything goes smooth until Sharmila tells about her proposal of marriage with Krishna Sastry to her dad and her dad sends his brothers to talk with Krishna's Parents. Sulaiman reveals his identity to Sharmila and sets to Krishna Sastry's House. There too he plays a game with the weaknesses of Krishna Sastry's mother so that she would refer to Sulaiman as her son before Narasimha Naidu's brothers. Things get on the right path and marriage planning activities are done in full swing.

Rudrama Naidu's son wants to marry Sharmila so that he can torture her to the core. This plan disturbs him and Rudrama Naidu threatens Narasimha Sastry to leave her or else his son Krishna Sastry would be killed. Thus Narasimha Sastry summons Krishna Sastry and finds out that he neither loves Sharmila nor performed the Yagam. Sulaiman enters the scene, plays a game again, forces Narasimha Sastry to misrepresent Sulaiman as Krishna Sastry at that place. Sulaiman makes Narasimha Naidu to invite Saraswati for the marriage and Basha says that he would come to the marriage only for Sharmila. Thus when the family along with Sulaiman visit the temple, Rudrama Naidu attacks Narasimha Naidu's family and Sulaiman makes a call to Basha that he is attacked. Basha reaches there with his men and in an emotional juncture, he saves Narasimha's family and Narasimha saves Saraswati. After learning the truth that Sulaiman acted as Krishna Sastry, he asks about the reason for the fraud and Sulaiman tells him that it was to unite the two families. Thus the two families unite and Sulaiman marries Sharmila.

Cast

 Vishnu Manchu as Sulaiman / Fake Krishna Sastry
 Hansika Motwani as Sharmila
 Prabhu as Veera Narasimha Naidu
 Brahmanandam as Bangaraju
 Aishwarya Gorak as Aparna
 Suman as Basha
 Kota Srinivasa Rao as Rudrama Naidu
 Dharmavarapu Subramanyam as Malinga Sastry
 Vennela Kishore as David
 M. S. Narayana as Sampangi Sastry
 Subbaraju as Veera Narasimha Naidu's brother
 Nagineedu as Veera Narasimha Naidu's father
 Seetha as Saraswathi
 AVS as Narasimha Sastry
 Master Bharath as Raghulingam Sastry
 Ravi Prakash as Veera Narasimha Naidu's brother
 Samrat Reddy as Krishna Sastry
 Pragathi
 Satyam Rajesh
 Raghu Babu
 Chalapathi Rao as ACP K. Divakar
 L. B. Sriram
 Prabhas (Cameo) Voice

Production

Filming
It was officially launched on 5 January 2012 in Hyderabad. The first schedule was held in Hyderabad itself. The pooja and Muhurtham shot were done in IRCT College Gachibowli RTTC Bhavan Gachibowli. Exclusively for the songs, the crew went to Bangkok and shot the songs in the most beautiful locations which are apt for the songs. Another large portion was filmed in Tirupathi for the want of the village environment & serenity.  A parody song was shot with all the characters in the movie in the sets of Manikonda Hyderabad. The CG work was done in Thinksmart, a post-production company owned by Vishnu Manchu himself.  A song featuring over 50 junior artists and Vishnu was shot on the beaches of Bangkok. In fact, most of the film was shot in sets of Manikonda, which cost a whopping sum of more than 5 crores. The shooting of this movie is going on in and around Hyderabad for the past few days. The director is filming the climax scenes on Vishnu Manchu, Hansika Motwani, Kota Srinivasa Rao, Brahmanandam and the goons. With this schedule the completed except for songs and some talkie part. G. Nageswara Reddy, who has a brand name of comedy films director is directing this out and out, comedy entertainer. Hansika Motwani is paired up with Vishnu Manchu for the first time in her career. Yuvan Shankar Raja & Chakri are scoring the music and audio of the movie will be released soon after the completion of the shoot. Kona Venkat is the script writer for this film. Director G Nageshwar Reddy shot this laugh riot in the exotic locales of Malaysia, Bangkok, AP, etc.

Release
The film received a U/A certificate from the censor board and is planned to be released in October 2012. After the grand audio release in Malayalam with the eminent and tall figures from the Kolliwood are scheduled to appear for the fabulous audio launch of Denikaina Ready. The film’s formal censor certificate is not issued by the board due to its highly objectionable matter. Apparently, the movie hurts the sentiments of Brahmin communities. Many of them have gone to court against the producers of the film. This has upset the release plans of the movie. "It is blackmail, what the censor member is doing", said a very livid Mohan Babu. Vishnu Manchu also took to Twitter and said "Ridiculous how the respected member is harassing. This is pure blackmail. I am going to fight this and will not let her stop my film". The movie’s censor issues have been resolved after the revising committee cleared the movie with some major objections and the film was released on 24 October 2012.

Casting
Jr. NTR was rumoured to make a cameo appearance in this film. The audio release of this film was held on 23 September. Prabhas has dubbed for few dialogues for Vishnu Manchu in this film. The film hit the screens in October 2012.

Controversy
In this film, Brahmins are shown eating chicken Haleem and chicken chops, and a married brahmin woman commenting that any male touch reminded of her husband, which caused friction among the community. Brahmin organizations protested against the film makers and reached Mohan Babu's house. The protesters were indiscriminately beaten with sticks, which led to further retaliation by Brahmins who threw shoes on Vishnu's car. Mohan Babu commented on the protesters saying "Those who protested in front of my house are not real Brahmans and they are all blackmailers and they might have come for some money" which further irked the Brahmin community.

Based on a local court's directive, the Malkajgiri police booked cases against actors M. Mohan Babu, M. Vishnu, and director G. Nageswar Reddy for portraying Brahmins in a poor light. A student from Malkajgiri, G. Pavan Kumar, filed a petition in the court urging it to direct police to book cases against the producer, director and lead actors of Denikaina Ready for insulting the Brahmin community. Writer of the movie BVS Ravi has given a public apology through ABN channel for hurting the Brahmin community unintentionally.

The Censor board of Andhra Pradesh has not issued the censor certificate for this movie as it wanted the producers of the film to remove some controversial scenes. However, the producers of the film went ahead and obtained the certificate from the censor board in Mumbai.

Remake 

Khiladi is a remake of 2012 Telugu movie Denikaina Ready which itself was a remake of the 1999 Malayalam film Udayapuram Sulthan.

Soundtrack

The audio album of the film has been composed by Yuvan Shankar Raja and Chakri. The soundtrack features five tracks that belong to varied genres including a parody. The audio album was released on 28 September at the lavish Gandharva Mahal set erected for the film Uu Kodathara? Ulikki Padathara?. Dr Brahmanandam launched the first audio CD and handed over the first copy to Padmasri Dr. Mohan Babu. Dr. Mohan Babu, Kota Srinivasa Rao, L. B. Sriram, AVS, Kona Venkat, Gopi Mohan, BVSN Ravi, Nageswara Reddy, Chakri, Ramajogayya Shastri, Ananta Sriram and others graced the function and wished for success.

Telugu

Malayalam 
The audio of the Malayalam version of Denikaina Ready, titled Endhenum Ready, will be released on the hands of Mollywood actor Mohanlal in a function to be held 15 October in Cochin. The audio rights of the film were acquired by Satyam Audios. Vishnu tweeted, "Just done with the audio launch of Denikaina Ready. Launched by MohanLal uncle. Loved the response" (sic). This is the first time Vishnu's film is releasing in Malayalam.

Release
The film was dubbed into Malayalam as Endhinum Ready and was released simultaneously with Telugu. It was dubbed into Tamil as Naangaellam Appave Appadi, in Hindi as Sabse Badi Hera Pheri 2 in 2015 and Bhojpuri as Sabse Bada Gadbad Ghotala.

Critical reception
Mahesh Koneru of 123telugu.com gave a review of rating 3.5/5 stating "Overall, you will walk out of the theater happy. Denikaina Ready is a good, time pass entertainer that makes for a nice holiday watch." Jeevi of idlebrain.com gave a review of 3.25/5 stating "Denikaina Ready is a comedy film with an underlying sentiment. The Interval twist is interesting. The director has succeeded in creating a typical Priyadarshan type of satire of mistaken identities. The plus points of the film are Vishnu - Brahmanandam comedy. On the flip side, the story depends on the clichéd aspect of Rayalaseema faction wars. On a whole, Denikaina Ready has enough ingredients to work at the box office. Super Good Movies gave a review of rating 3/5 stating "A Good Entertainer from Vishnu, Brahmanandam Combination. You must watch." zimbio.com gave a review stating "Denikaina Ready good entertainer. Go enjoy it !!" apherald gave a review of rating 3.75/5 stating "Hilarious movie. Songs could have been better composed." telugu.way2movies.com gave a review of rating 3/5 stating the film to be a "High on Entertainment!!!". mirchi9.com gave a review stating "Denikaina Ready is a very good comedy entertainer which can be watched along with your family and friends in this holiday season." Sify.com gave a review of rating 3/5 stating "Denikaina Ready is a time pass flick. Although it runs with formula comedy scenes, it also has some genuine comedy sequences and the film moves on with regular doses of laughs." This got a wide release in more than 300 plus centers and got a 100-day run in 8 centers and a 175-day run in 1 center.

Awards

References

External links
 

2010s Telugu-language films
2012 films
Telugu remakes of Malayalam films
Films scored by Yuvan Shankar Raja
Films scored by Chakri
Indian action comedy films
Films directed by G. Nageswara Reddy
2012 action comedy films